Gottfried Knebel (born 1908, date of death unknown) was a German botanist.

References 

1908 births
20th-century German botanists
Year of death missing